The Alaska North Slope (Iñupiaq: Siḷaliñiq) is the region of the U.S. state of  Alaska located on the northern slope of the Brooks Range along the coast of two marginal seas of the Arctic Ocean, the Chukchi Sea being on the western side of Point Barrow, and the Beaufort Sea on the eastern.

The entire Arctic coastal plain of Alaska with its Arctic coastal tundra has tremendous ecological importance with the densest concentration of birds in the Arctic. The region includes the Arctic National Wildlife Refuge as well as the National Petroleum Reserve–Alaska.

Topography

Within the North Slope, only a surface "active layer" of the tundra thaws each season; most of the soil is permanently frozen year-round. On top of this permafrost, water flows to sea via shallow, braided streams or settles into pools and ponds. Along the bottom of the Landsat 7 image on the right, the rugged terrain of the Brooks Range mountains is snow-covered in places (blue areas) and exposed (pink areas) in others.

Much of the region is located politically in North Slope Borough, and geographically in the Alaska North Slope basin.

On August 12, 2018, a 6.3 magnitude earthquake hit the region, the most powerful recorded for the Alaskan North Slope.

Ecology
The region includes the Arctic National Wildlife Refuge. The entire coastal plain of Alaska has tremendous ecological importance with the densest concentration of birds in the Arctic.

Petroleum resources

Under the North Slope is an ancient seabed, which is the source of the oil. Within the North Slope, there is a geological feature called the Barrow Arch — a belt of the kind of rock known to be able to serve as a trap for oil. It runs from the city of Utqiaġvik to a point just west of the Arctic National Wildlife Refuge. 

Ira Harkey quotes Noel Wien as stating that in the 1920s, "To keep warm and to cook with, the Eskimo was burning hunks of dark stuff he just picked up on the ground all around his tent.  This was oil from seepage under the tundra.  The Eskimos had always known about the oil, long before there was any drilling for it."

The North Slope region includes the National Petroleum Reserve–Alaska, which was established after native Alaskans showed white whalers oil coming out of the ground. It contains the bulk of Alaska's known petroleum until the Prudhoe Bay Oil Field was discovered (outside the NPRA) in 1968, followed by the Kuparuk River oil field in 1969. 
The petroleum extracted from the region is transferred south by means of the Trans-Alaska Pipeline System to Valdez on the Pacific Ocean. 

In 2005 the USGS estimated that the Arctic Alaska Petroleum Province, encompassing all the lands and adjacent Continental Shelf areas north of the Brooks Range-Herald arch (see map) held more than 50 billion bbl of oil and natural-gas liquids and 227 trillion cubic feet of gas.

The source rock for the Prudhoe Bay Oil Field and neighboring reserves is also a potential source for unconventional tight oil and shale gas – possibly containing "up to 2 billion barrels of technically recoverable oil and up to 80 trillion cubic feet of natural gas, according to a 2012 U.S. Geological Survey report."

However Alaska North Slope (ANS) is a more expensive waterborne crude oil. Since 1987, Alaska North Slope (ANS) crude production has been in decline.

As of 2020, the U.S. Geological Survey estimated 3.6 billion barrels of oil and 8.9 trillion cubic feet of natural gas in Mississippian through Paleogene strata in the central North Slope of Alaska, which are undiscovered and technically recoverable.

See also 
 Arctic Alaska-Chukotka terrane
 Arctic coastal tundra
 Arctic foothills tundra
 BP#1993–1995: Hazardous substance dumping
 Mount Elbert Gas Hydrate Site
 North Slope Borough

References

External links 

 DOE report on North Slope Oil and Gas
 northslope.org, North Slope Science Initiative official website
 

Beaufort Sea
Brooks Range
Chukchi Sea
Geography of North Slope Borough, Alaska
Inuit territories
Regions of Alaska